Jimmy Nievez, born in 1969, is a disc jockey of New York City, Boston, and San Juan, Puerto Rico. And Program Director from San Juan, Puerto Rico.

His most recent accomplishments were as Program Director of two of Uno Radio Group's most important radio stations, Fidelity and SalSoul. At Fidelity, an adult contemporary station, Nievez was able to bring the station the luster it had lost. This earned him the respect of his superiors and the chance to Program their most difficult and important station, SalSoul.

His career started in the mid-1980s. After several years of disc jockeying in numerous radio stations, Nieves became one of the original disc jockeys of Cosmos 94 FM, Tu Emisora Radioactiva. The first radio station targeting Underground Rap followers, known today as the music phenomenon reggaeton. Cosmos was also the first radio chain in Puerto Rico, covering the entire island.

In 1998, Jimmy was offered the opportunity to be part of a new radio station in New York, Caliente 105.9. Nieves was co-host of "La Jungla De New York" (The New York Jungle), alongside Danny Cruz. An afternoon drive talk show, which soon became the stations' biggest hit. At Caliente, he was also in charge of creating the station's identity.

In New York City, television became an integral part of his resume, as he co-hosted a variety and entertainment show called "Sabado Al Mediodia" (Saturday at Midday), which became the top rated local Spanish television program on Univision's New York affiliate, WXTV-41.

Nievez was given the opportunity to host Jimmy y Boquita En La Manana on WEMG in Boston, with Dominican comedian Rosemery Almonte. Boquita achieving the highest ratings in the station's history.

Following his success in Boston, came yet another chance at hosting a morning talk show in the Big Apple and his third DJ gig in a brand new project. At Rumba 107.1 FM, Nieves hosted "Wassup NY", while still working with "Boquita".

He returned to Puerto Rico to work again with Danny Cruz, in La Perrera (The Dog House). An afternoon drive talk show on Puerto Rico's top-rated radio network, Cadena Salsoul. Nieves was then called, for a third time, to host a show in NYC once again. Alongside Dominican entertainer Frederick Martinez, "El Pacha", El Jangueo (Hanging) at WCAA, became the biggest hit at New York's only reggaeton station.

Today He leaves the stages and the lights to become one of the most important executives in the radio of Puerto Rico. He is the director of Uno Radio Group.

Appearances, interviews, and awards
He has been interviewed on television shows such as "Despierta America" (Univision) and "Escandalo TV" (Telefutura), and has also appeared in mayor local Latino events such as the Puerto Rican Day Parade (Timeline of New York City events) and Dominican Day Parade.

He has himself interviewed many major Latino celebrities and personalities including Ricky Martin, Juanes, Celia Cruz, Rubén Blades, Alejandro Fernández, Shakira, and Daddy Yankee.

Early years
He was born in New York City (Spanish Harlem, also known as East Harlem or El Barrio) to Puerto Rican parents. At the age of ten Jimmy's family moved to Puerto Rico where he grew up and lived most of his youth years.

At age 14, he started working at different radio stations in the southern coast of Puerto Rico, soon he was doing everything from production, to board operator, and DJing. He even gained experience as a Program Director of WENA, in Yauco, Puerto Rico. It was this experience at WENA which later became evident in his success at Uno Radio Group. He got the opportunity to host his first morning show on WRIO FM in Ponce City. From there on, Jimmy garnered enough experience to take him to the radio big leagues in NYC.

External links
Jimmy Nieves
La Kalle 105.9 FM
Arbitron
Bajo Fuego

See also
El Jangueo
List of Puerto Ricans

American radio personalities
Living people
1969 births
People from East Harlem
People from San Juan, Puerto Rico